Carl M. Cronin was a quarterback who played two seasons in the Canadian Football League for the Winnipeg Pegs. He then was a head coach for the Calgary Bronks for five seasons. In 1967, he was inducted into the Canadian Football Hall of Fame.

References

Year of birth missing
Year of death missing
American players of Canadian football
Canadian football quarterbacks
Calgary Stampeders coaches
Notre Dame Fighting Irish football players
Winnipeg Blue Bombers coaches
Winnipeg Blue Bombers players
Canadian Football Hall of Fame inductees
Sportspeople from Chicago
Players of American football from Chicago
Players of Canadian football from Chicago